The 2019–20 Kentucky Wildcats men's basketball team represented the University of Kentucky in the 2019–20 NCAA Division I men's basketball season. The team played its home games in Lexington, Kentucky for the 44th consecutive season at Rupp Arena, with a capacity of 20,545. The Wildcats were led by John Calipari in his 11th season as head coach and played in the Southeastern Conference. They finished the season 25–6, 15–3 in SEC play to win the SEC regular season championship. They were set to be the No. 1 seed in the SEC tournament with a bye to the quarterfinals. However, the SEC Tournament was cancelled amid the COVID-19 pandemic. With the SEC Tournament cancelled, they were awarded the SEC's automatic bid to the NCAA tournament. However, the NCAA Tournament was also cancelled due to the COVID-19 pandemic.

Previous season
The Wildcats finished the 2018–19 season 30–7, 15–3 in SEC play to finish in a tie for second. In the SEC tournament, the Wildcats defeated Alabama, but were defeated by Tennessee in the semi-finals of the tournament. The Wildcats received an at-large bid NCAA tournament. As the No. 2 seed in the Midwest Region, they defeated No. 15 Abilene Christian, No. 7 Wofford, and No. 3 Houston to advance to the Elite Eight. There, they lost to the No. 5-seed Auburn.

Offseason

Departures

On April 9, 2019, P. J. Washington announced that he would be entering the 2019 NBA Draft and would sign with an agent. However, due to changes in NCAA rules that took effect with the 2019 draft, signing with an agent no longer automatically results in loss of NCAA eligibility. On April 16, Tyler Herro announced that he would remain in the NBA draft, forgoing his remaining eligibility. The following day, two more players announced their departures, with Keldon Johnson announcing he would leave Kentucky and stay in the 2019 NBA draft and Jemarl Baker announcing his intention to transfer from Kentucky.

2019 recruiting class

In May Kentucky announced the completion of its 2019 signing class.  It ranked as a consensus top-three class for the eleventh straight season under Calipari.  The 2019 class consists of forward Dontaie Allen (Falmouth, KY), forward Keion Brooks Jr. (Fort Wayne, IN), guard Johnny Juzang (Studio City, CA), guard Tyrese Maxey (Garland, TX), and forward Kahlil Whitney (Chicago).

On May 9, 2018, Maxey committed to become the first member of the class.  He chose Kentucky over offers from Michigan State and Texas. Maxey was ranked as the consensus #2 ranked point guard in the 2019 class, and became a McDonald's All-American.

On August 2, 2018, Allen committed to Kentucky over offers from Florida and Louisville. On March 5, 2019 Allen was named Kentucky Mr. Basketball.

On August 8, 2018, Kahlil Whitney committed to play basketball for UK over offers from Illinois and Georgetown. Whitney is the third commitment to commit in the 2019 class and is ranked #19 overall in the 2019 class by 247 sports.

On March 15, 2019, Keion Brooks Jr., from Fort Wayne, IN, committed to play basketball for Kentucky over offers from Michigan State and Indiana. Brooks is the fourth recruit to commit in the 2019 class and is ranked #23 overall in the 2019 by 247 sports.

On May 10, 2019, Johnny Juzang committed to play basketball for Kentucky over an offer to play for Virginia. Juzang is the fifth commitment to commit in the 2019 class and is ranked #32 overall in the 2019 class by 247 sports.

Incoming transfers
On April 4, 2019, Nate Sestina announced that he would transfer to Kentucky for the 2019–2020 season. Sestina was named second team All-Patriot league for Bucknell and averaged 15.8 PPG and 8.7 RPG in his final year with the Bisons. As a grad transfer, he is eligible to play immediately under NCAA rules.

2020 recruiting class
On July 27, 2019, Brandon Boston Jr. committed to play basketball for the University of Kentucky over offers from Florida and Duke. Boston is the first commitment to the 2020 recruiting class and the #2 ranked shooting guard in the 2020 class by 247 sports.

Cam'Ron Fletcher, from St. Louis, Missouri, is the second commitment in the Kentucky 2020 recruiting class. He committed to Kentucky on August 4, 2019, and chose Kentucky over Michigan State. He is a consensus four-star player by the four main recruiting services and is ranked #36 overall by 24/7 Sports.

Power forward Lance Ware, from Camden, New Jersey, is the third commitment in the Kentucky 2020 recruiting class. He committed to Kentucky on September 12, 2019, and chose Kentucky over Ohio State. He is a consensus four-star player by the four main recruiting services and is ranked #32 overall by Rivals.

Two days later, on September 14, 2019, SF Terrence Clarke from Brewster Academy pledged to Kentucky. Clarke is one of the most highly regarded prospects in the 2020 class, with most services ranking him among the top five players overall.

Other news
As part of a major renovation of Rupp Arena, included within a larger expansion project for the attached Central Bank Center convention complex, nearly half of the upper arena bowl, originally consisting entirely of bleacher seating, was refitted with chairback seats during the 2019 offseason. This reduced the arena's basketball capacity by nearly 3,000—from 23,500 to 20,545.

On January 27, 2020, it was announced that Lexington Center's overall naming rights were sold to Central Bank, a local community bank, by the Lexington Center Corporation and JMI Sports, which handles the multimedia rights for both the LCC and the University of Kentucky. The Rupp name will continue to receive primacy in the fourteen-year agreement for the arena portion of the complex, and be known as "Rupp Arena at Central Bank Center".

Roster

Depth chart

Schedule and results

|-
!colspan=12 style=| Exhibition

|-
!colspan=12 style=| Regular season

|-
!colspan=12 style=| SEC tournament
|- style="background:#bbbbbb"
| style="text-align:center"|March 13, 20201:00 pm, ESPN
| style="text-align:center"| (1) No. 8
| vs. Quarterfinals
| colspan=5 rowspan=1 style="text-align:center"|Cancelled due to the COVID-19 pandemic
| style="text-align:center"|Bridgestone ArenaNashville, TN
|-

SEC tournament 
The Wildcats received the No. 1 seed in the SEC tournament. However, the 2020 SEC Men's Basketball Tournament was cancelled before the Wildcats played their first game, due to the COVID-19 pandemic.

2020 NCAA men's basketball tournament 
Like the SEC Tournament, the NCAA tournament was cancelled amidst concern over the health of participants as a result of the COVID-19 outbreak in the United States.

Rankings

*AP does not release post-NCAA Tournament rankings

References

Kentucky
Kentucky Wildcats men's basketball seasons
Kentucky basketball, men, 2019-20
Kentucky basketball, men